Wuḍūʾ is the Islamic procedure for cleansing parts of the body, a type of ritual purification, or ablution. The 4 Fardh (Mandatory) acts of Wudu consists of washing the face, arms, then wiping the head and the feet with water.

Wudu is an important part of ritual purity in Islam. It is governed by fiqh (Islamic jurisprudence), which specifies rules concerning hygiene and defines the rituals that constitute it.

It is typically performed before prayers (salah or salat). Activities that invalidate wudu include urination, defecation, flatulence, deep sleep, light bleeding (depending on madhhab), menstruation, postpartum and sexual intercourse.

Wudu is often translated as 'partial ablution', as opposed to ghusl as 'full ablution' where the whole body is washed. It also contrasts with tayammum ('dry ablution'), which uses sand or dust in place of water, principally due to water scarcity or other harmful effects on the person. Purification of the body and clothes is called taharah.

Basis of Wudu

Quran
Qur'an 2:222 says  The Islamic prophet Muhammad said that "Cleanliness is half of faith."

Fiqh (Islamic jurisprudence)
Wudu by itself is a mustahabb (recommendable act) in Islamic rites, but it becomes obligatory in special conditions such as daily prayers (salah) and tawaf and worship.

Description in Hadith 
Wudu in Hadith Abu Hurairah, in reference to the Day of Resurrection, reported that Muhammad, when asked if he would be able to recognize Muslims, said, "Yes, you would have a mark which other people will not have. You would come to me with a white blaze on your foreheads and white marks on your feet because of the traces of ablution."

Abu Hurayra said, "I have heard prophet (may peace be upon him) say, "In a believer adornment would reach the places where ablution reaches."

Uthman stated that Muhammad said, "He who performed ablution well, his sins would come out from his body, even coming out from under his nails."

Umar reported that Muhammad said, "No one among you does wuḍūʾ and does wuḍūʾ thoroughly – or adequately – and then testifies, 'There is no god but Allah Alone with no partner and I testify that Muhammad is Allah's Messenger', without the eight doors of the Garden being opened to him so that he can enter by whichever of them he wishes."

Performing wudu from large bodies of water 
It is mentioned in numerous Hadiths by Ja'far al-Sadiq that it is permissible to make wudu with water that is not overwhelmed with the smell of dead animals. If there is a dead animal, it is recommended to take wudu from the opposite side of the location of the animal. He also said it is permissible to take wudu from the ponds between Mecca and Medina in which people perform ghusl, dogs and beasts drink, and animals die so long as the water level is at least up to the knees.

Performing wudu from a well 
It has been narrated by Ali al-Ridha that if a drop of urine, blood or animal feces falls into a well, one must remove about ten buckets from it before performing wudu. If the feces has disintegrated into the water, forty to fifty buckets must be removed. Ja'far al-Sadiq has also mentioned that if an animal falls into the well, and has not disintegrated in it, remove five to seven buckets of water from it or until the smell or taste of the water changes. However, If the animal is bleeding or has an open wound, one must draw out thirty to forty buckets before it becomes purified for wudu. If a camel dies in the well or wine is poured into the well, all the water must be drained.

Ritual requirements

Types of water
Permitted
The water of Wudu must be mutlaq meaning pure or unmixed (not necessarily chemically pure). The name of a liquid that is normally regarded by individuals as water.
Melted snow or hail
Water of ocean, lakes or ponds.
Well water or fountain water

Prohibited
Green water (green water usually means dirty water)
Water made from any trees or fruits 
Water which contains urine, blood, or stool, or has been touched by a live or a dead animal
Used water of wuḍūʾ or ghusl (according to the Hanbali School of Thought)

There are other acts that are performed during wuḍūʾ and the detailed acts of the wuḍūʾ can be classed into 3 types:

Farā'id according to Sunni Muslims
According to Sunni Muslims, the Qur'anic mandate for wudu comes in the sixth ayah of sura 5. The ayah has been translated by Muhammad Muhsin Khan, Rashad Khalifa, Abdullah Yusuf Ali, Pickthall and Maulana Muhammad Ali as follows. Note that these scholars' translation refers to washing the feet.

Referencing the above verse, the Sunni schools of thought have consensus that the following four actions are obligatory in wudu (Farā'id, aka Faraid, is the singular of fard and means "Obligatory ritual duties commanded by God. Generally refers to the five daily prayers, charity, fasting, and pilgrimage"), i.e. necessary for wudu to be valid:
 Washing the face
 Washing both arms from the tips of the fingers up to and including the elbows
 Wiping the head. However, there is a difference of opinion on the sufficient portion. 
 Washing both the feet up to and including the ankles.

The obligation of the following actions is debated among the fiqh schools of thought, though if not deemed obligatory they are considered recommended:

 Intention, i.e. resolving in the heart that one is performing wudu as an act of worship rather than an ordinary cleaning activity. This is obligatory in the Maliki, Shafi'i and Hanbali madhhab schools.
 Performing Wudu in consecutive actions, i.e. there should not be prolonged pauses during the ritual. This is considered obligatory in the Maliki and Hanbali schools.
 Performing the actions of wudu order, i.e. washing the face then arms then wiping the face and finally washing the feet. This is obligatory in the Shafi'i and Hanbali schools. 
 Rubbing the washed organs while washing. This is obligatory in the Maliki school.

It is not sufficient for one to pass wet hand over the feet. Under certain conditions masah can be done over leather footgear known as khuffs. This is confirmed in several 
Narrated by Abd-Allah ibn Amr: "...we were just passing wet hands over our feet (not washing them thoroughly) so he addressed us in a loud voice saying twice or 3x, 'Save your heels from the fire.'."
Narrated by 'Ubaid Ibn Juraij: "...and he used to perform ablution while wearing the shoes (i.e. wash his feet and then put on the shoes)."
Narrated by Yahya Al-Mazini: " 'Can you show me how Allah's Apostle used to perform ablution?' ...and washed his feet (up to the ankles)."
Narrated by 'Amr: "...and then he washed his feet up to the ankles."
Narrated by Humran: "...and washed his feet up to the ankles..."
Narrated by 'Amr bin Yahya: "...and washed his feet up to the ankles..."
Narrated by 'Abdullah bin Zaid: "...and washed his feet (up to the ankles)."

Farā'id according to Shia Muslims 

Shia Muslims also believe the Qur'anic mandate for wuḍūʾ comes in the sixth ayat of Al-Ma'ida, the 5th sura. The ayat has been translated by Muhammad Habib Shakir as follows. (Note this scholar's translation refers to wiping the feet.)

 Washing the face once or twice with your right hand.
 Washing both the arms including the elbows once or twice (left hand washes the right arm and then right hand washes the left arm).
 Wiping one fourth of the head with the water left on your right hand.
 Wiping both the feet once up to with the water remaining on both hands (right hand, right foot. left hand, left foot).

Mustahabbāt (recommended acts)
A handful of mustahabb (recommended and meritorious but not required) acts that are considered to make the wuḍūʾ better. If one of these acts is omitted, the wuḍūʾ is still considered valid.

Reciting the shahadah after the ablution.
 During wuḍūʾ one should not engage in worldly talk.
 Choosing a clean place for ablution.
 Not wasting water in ablution.
 Starting from the right side and then the left.
 Doing any dhikr that brings you closer to Allah, such as Istighfar or any other dhikr you like.

Alternatives 
Muslims who are unable to perform the prevailing form of ablution, due to skin disease, a disability or lack of clean water, etc. are recommended to perform tayammum, sometimes called 'dry ablution', using sand or dust instead of water. Such an alternative form of ritual purity may also be accepted in cases where one fears hypothermia in cold weather.

Tayammum is also to be performed when one is defiled (on janabah) and could not perform ghusl, and is authorised under specific circumstances.

Performance

Wudu in Sunnism 

Sunni Muslims perform the following:

 (Make sure that all parts of the body to be washed for wudu are fully wet before moving on to the next part)
Start by making niyyah (intention) to perform wuḍūʾ and cleanse the mind, body and soul of their impurities.
Recite bismillah. (correction: just think "Bismillah" in your head because mentioning the name of Allah in the bathroom is not proper)
Wash the right hand up to the wrist (and between the fingers) up to three times (3 times is sunnah but once is fard/mandatory), then similarly for the left hand.
Next gargle water in your mouth and spit out the water (up to three times). Brush the teeth with a miswak if available (this should be done before wudu, before the rinsing of the mouth or just before salah); it is recommended to use a miswak after drinking milk or consuming any kind of fats
Some water should be taken in the right hand and sniffed into the nostrils thrice and then blown out (especially after waking up from sleep). The left pinkie should be used for cleaning the right and left nostrils (respectively) after each rinse.
Wash the entirety of the face (from the hairline to the beard *if applicable* and be sure to run your fingers through your beard) If any strands of hair fall over the face, don't move it aside as it is sunnah to dap the wet hands over the strands. Wash the face up to three times (but once is mandatory).
Wash the entire right arm, including the hand, up to and including the elbow (up to three times); then the left arm (up to three times). Pass fingers of one hand between the fingers of the other hand to ensure no part is left dry. Rings and bracelets should be removed to ensure no part of the hands are dry and this applies to certain kinds of earrings as well.
Then perform masah. Wet hands should be passed all over and through the hair to the ends of the hair; then (without washing the hands) the index fingers of the right and left hands should be used to clean the bends of the right and left ears (simultaneously) and in the same operation, the thumbs should be used to clean the back of the ears; One may not make masah over a Muslim head cap. 
Starting with the right foot, wash both feet from the toes up to and including the ankles thrice. Be sure to clean in between the toes of both the feet beginning from the little toe of the right foot and ending with the little toe of the left foot.
After wudu, it is recommended to recite Durood or the shahadah
“Ašhadu ʾan lā ʾilāha ʾilla -llāhu, wa-ʾašhadu ʾanna muḥammadan rasūlu -llāh.”
Then one may recite this Dua:
“Allahummaz aal-ni minttwwabi-n waz-aal-ni minal mu-ta-tahhirin”
Offer two-rak'at if or in case your wudu was done improperly. (addition: if you forgot to wash, and or clean any part, if you haven't dried yourself, you could always redo the part.)
The procedure for tayammum is somewhat different.

Invalidation 

Theoretically, one can perform one wuḍūʾ for salat and this wudu would be considered valid for the rest of the day, unless you nullify it by certain means. Muslims believe that certain acts invalidate the wudu (often referred to as 'breaking wudu' and 'losing wudu'), although the Qur'an does not explain most of these, and rules differ among schools. According to Hidden Pearls website,
During the research and production of this video & blog post, we came across so many conflicting opinions on what breaks wudu and what doesn’t. Different schools of thought vary widely on this issue unfortunately. Especially in the cases of ruling on general bleeding & vomiting, we were even surprised that there seems to be no correct answer.

According to Sunni Muslims 
According to Sunni Islam, the following invalidate wudu:

Slow-wave sleep while reclining.
Sleeping with the help of support - sleeping while standing or sitting without taking any kind of support does not break wudu.
Loss of senses.
Fainting.
Defecation or urination.
Odorous or audible emissions of flatulence.
Emission of semen (ghusl is required).
Vomiting - Mouthful vomiting contains water or pus or blood or food invalidates the wudu, vomiting contains cough does not break the wudu.
Touching the private parts with the bare hands (not according to Hanafi Madhhab).
Blood or pus leaving the body so that it leaves the point of exit (however if the blood or pus exits from the private parts then any amount breaks wuḍūʾ). Note that bleeding except private parts does not invalidate wuḍūʾ according to Shafi'i Madhhab.

According to Shia Muslims 
According to Shia theology, the following invalidate wudu:
 when waste or matter exits the lower most extremities of the body, the anus and urethra, as either feces, urine, semen or gas.  For wudhu to be invalid through flatulence, one must actually hear or smell the passing, otherwise it is not considered void. 
 when someone falls into a deep sleep in which they have no alert consciousness.
 anything cause to loss of one's consciousness such as craze, drunkenness, anesthesia.
 anything that needs Ghusl such as Junub and touching a corpse under special circumstances.

Belching and vomiting do not invalidate wudhu, however it is strongly recommended that the individual rinses his or her mouth following the latter. Bleeding is not considered to invalidate wudhu either, as Ja'far al-Sadiq made it clear in Hadith that a bad wound is not cause to repeat wudhu. This concept further extends to parasites that may exit the body through the two extremities. Cutting one's hair or nails does not invalidate wudhu but he or she should wipe the area with water.

See also
Sebil (fountain), public water fountain in Islamic countries or near mosques.
Shadirvan, a typical Ottoman fountain usually built in the yard or at the entrance of religious buildings (mosques, khanqahs, madrasas) and caravanserais
Rishama, washing of the face and limbs before prayers in Mandaeism
Ritual purification
Ghusl
Chōzuya, a Shinto water ablution pavilion 
Fard, an Islamic religious duty
Mustahabb, an Islamic term referring to recommended, favoured or virtuous actions
Types of water in Fiqh (Islamic jurisprudence)

References

External links

Ritual Purity in the Qur’an, hadith and fiqh (Islamic jurisprudence) including ablution/wuḍūʾ
Ablutions (wuḍūʾ) translation of Sahih al-Bukhari
The Book of Purification (Kitab Al-Taharah) translation of Sahih Muslim
wuḍūʾ details from Teachings of Islam (Talim-ul-Haq)
Ablution in Quraan n Sunnah
Video on How to perform ablution (wuzu) prio to Salah (prayer in Islam)
How to perform wuḍūʾ according to Sunni
Online Islamic courses for How to make Wudu according to Sunni
Karim Abuzaid How to do Wudu while taking a shower a.k.a Ghusl

Arabic words and phrases in Sharia
Islamic terminology
Ritual purity in Islam
Salah terminology
Salah
Water and religion